Sue Morgan may refer to:

 Sue Morgan (Hollyoaks), a character in the TV series Hollyoaks
 Sue Morgan (rower) (born 1952), American rower